The Voice Kids was a South Korean reality singing television competition for children aged 6 to 14 on Mnet. It is based on the Dutch reality singing competition of the same name. No information on a second season was revealed as of 2023.

Series overview 

 Team Seo
 Team Yoon
 Team Yang

References

External links
 

2013 South Korean television series debuts
2013 South Korean television series endings
Korean-language television shows
South Korean music television shows
Mnet (TV channel) original programming
The Voice of Korea
Television series about children
Television series about teenagers